Astaffort is a commune in the Lot-et-Garonne department in southwestern France. It is situated on the river Gers, about 15 km south of Agen. Astaffort has a mill and the church of Sainte-Geneviève.

Population

Personalities
The popular singer-songwriter Francis Cabrel spent his childhood in Astaffort.

See also
Communes of the Lot-et-Garonne department

References

Communes of Lot-et-Garonne